Newton Hills State Park is a South Dakota state park in Lincoln County, South Dakota in the United States. Newton Hill State Park is open for year-round recreation including camping, swimming, fishing, hiking and boating.

History
Newton Hill State Park is named for William Newton who was one of the first European American settlers to make a home in the area. Newton made his homestead in Lincoln County in the 1850s. His wife was a mid-wife and until the 1870s she was the only white person in the area who had the skills to deliver a baby or provide health care for the sick.

Some of the first people to live in the area were Native Americans from the Woodland Indian Culture. Archaeologists have discovered burial mounds and artifacts that have been dated back to 300 BC to 900 AD. The park is surrounded by a vast open prairie. But it is heavily forested making it a unique setting. The dark forests of the park have prompted many legends. Tales of buried gold and hideaways for horse thieves and robbers have been passed on through the years. A small unit of the United States Cavalry was chased into the forest by a group of Lakota warriors. Legend holds that the soldiers had a supply of gold which they buried in the park before they were killed by the Native Americans. Several searches have been made to locate the site of the battle and the gold, but so far nothing has been found. Frank and Jesse James used the forests of what is now the park as a temporary hideout after their famous robbery of a bank in Northfield, Minnesota The robbery in Northfield was not successful and after this robbery and a manhunt, only Frank and Jesse James were left alive and uncaptured.

Recreation
Newton Hills State Park is open for year-round recreation. Cabins and the group lodge are available to rent all year. The campground is open on a limited basis but the shower facilities are closed during the late fall, through winter and into early spring. The 108 of the 118 campsites have electric hook-ups. Restrooms facilities including showers are provided in a central location. The cabins are ADA accessible and are equipped with heating, air conditioning and furnishings. Several miles of trails are found in Newton Hills State Park, including horse and mountain bike trails. The trails are open during the winter months for cross-country skiing and snowshoeing.

Lake Lakota is open to fishing, swimming and boating. The common game fish are perch, bass, catfish and a variety of panfish. Newton Hills State Park is open to hunting. White-tailed deer and wild turkey may be taken with a bow and arrow. Other animals seen in the park include marmots, rabbits, squirrels and foxes. These animals are protected within the park.

Entertainment
Newton Hills State Park has become a prime location for various festivals. The Sioux River Folk Festival is held annually at the park. The festival is hosted by the Friends of Traditional Music. "FestiFall" is held in the autumn of the year to celebrate the arrival of the fall season. Events include pumpkin chunking, pumpkin carving competitions and other fall activities. Banana bikes are also available.

References

External links
 Newton Hills State Park

Protected areas of Lincoln County, South Dakota
State parks of South Dakota